The Monterrey Challenger is a professional tennis tournament played on hard courts. It is currently part of the ATP Challenger Tour. It is held annually in Monterrey, Mexico since 2015.

Past finals

Singles

Doubles

See also
 ATP Challenger Tour
 Monterrey Open

References

ATP Challenger Tour
Hard court tennis tournaments
Tennis tournaments in Mexico
Sport in Monterrey
Recurring sporting events established in 2015